Giancarlo Astrua (11 August 1927 – 29 July 2010) was an Italian professional road bicycle racer. He was born in Graglia.

Major results

1949
Giro d'Italia:
5th place overall classification
1950
Giro d'Italia:
Winner stage 15
1951
Giro d'Italia:
Winner stage 12
1952
Giro d'Italia:
7th place overall classification
Trofeo Baracchi (with Nino Defilippis)
1953
Giro della Romagna
Tour de France:
3rd place overall classification
1954
GP Industria in Belmonte-Piceno
Giro d'Italia:
5th place overall classification
1955
Giro d'Italia:
Winner stage 5
Tour de France:
7th place overall classification
1956
Vuelta a España:
Winner stage 12

References

External links 
 

1927 births
2010 deaths
People from Graglia
Italian Tour de France stage winners
Italian Giro d'Italia stage winners
Italian Vuelta a España stage winners
Cyclists from Piedmont
Sportspeople from the Province of Biella
20th-century Italian people